Brown's Ferry may refer to:

Places in the United States
(by state)

Browns Ferry Nuclear Power Plant, on the Tennessee River in Alabama
Brown's Ferry Park (Tualatin, Oregon), a park in Tualatin, Washington County, Oregon
Brown's Ferry, South Carolina, a community in Georgetown County, South Carolina, site of a ferry crossing over the Black River 
Brown's Ferry Park (South Carolina), a park on Old Brown's Ferry Road, by the Black River in Georgetown County, South Carolina
Brown's Ferry, Tennessee, a ferry crossing point over the Tennessee River near Chattanooga, Tennessee
Brown's Ferry, Texas, a settlement and ferry crossing point 
Brown's Ferry (Drakes Corner, Virginia), a house on the National Register of Historic Places in Southampton County, Virginia

Events
 Battle of Brown's Ferry, an American Civil War battle also known as Brown's Ferry or Battle of Wauhatchie at the Tennessee ferry crossing point

See also
Brown's Ferry Park (disambiguation)